Frollo, as a surname, may refer to the following:

Claude Frollo, the Archdeacon of Notre Dame Cathedral in Victor Hugo's novel The Hunchback of Notre Dame
Jehan Frollo, Claude Frollo's brother
Leone Frollo, an Italian comic book and erotic artist